Kashan (also Romanized as Kāshān also known as Deh-e Kāshbarkān, Deh-e Kāshparkān, and Kāshparkān) is a village in Ahmadi Rural District, Ahmadi District, Hajjiabad County, Hormozgan Province, Iran. At the 2006 census, its population was 73, in 21 families.

References 

Populated places in Hajjiabad County